Zbigniew Zamachowski (born 17 July 1961) is a Polish actor.

Life and career
He was born on 17 July 1961 in Brzeziny near Łódź. Zamachowski graduated from the actor's faculty of the National Film School in Łódź. He began his acting career in 1981 and in 1989 had a co-starring role in Part Ten (Thou Shalt Not Covet Thy Neighbor's Goods) of director Krzysztof Kieślowski's film series, Dekalog. Four years later, Kieślowski cast him as the lead character, "Karol Karol", in Three Colors: White, the second of his acclaimed Three Colors trilogy. He is a two-time winner of Polish Film Awards for his roles in Robert Gliński's film Hi, Tereska (2001) and Andrzej Jakimowski's film drama Zmróż oczy (2004). His other notable roles are featured in Kazimierz Kutz's film Colonel Kwiatkowski (1996), Jerzy Hoffman's historical film With Fire and Sword (1999) and Andrzej Wajda's biopic Walesa: Man of Hope (2013).

Between 1985 and 1997, he performed at The Studio Theater, and since 1997 he has been an actor at the National Theater in Warsaw.

Filmography
 Wielka majówka (1981) a.k.a. The Big Picnic
 Matka Królów (1983) a.k.a. Mother of Kings
 Ucieczka (1986) a.k.a. Escape, The
 Pierscien i róza (1987) a.k.a. The Ring and the Rose as Prince Bulbo
 Prywatne sledztwo (1987) a.k.a. Private Investigation as Truck passenger
 Possédés, Les (1988) a.k.a. The Possessed as Liamchine
 Zabij mnie, glino (1989) a.k.a. Kill Me, Cop as Seweryn
 Sztuka kochania (1989) a.k.a. Art of Loving as Ziobro
 Dekalog, dziesiec (1989) (TV) a.k.a. Thou Shalt Not Covet Thy Neighbor's Goods as Artur
 Korczak (1990) as Ichak Szulc
 Ucieczka z kina 'Wolnosc' (1991) a.k.a. Escape From the 'Liberty' Cinema as Pomocnik cenzora
 Seszele (1991) a.k.a. Seychelles as Stefek
 Ferdydurke (1991) a.k.a. Tom
 Tak, tak (1992) a.k.a. Yes, Yes
 Naprawde krótki film o milosci, zabijaniu i jeszcze jednym przykazaniu (1992) a.k.a. Really short movie about love, killing and one more commandment.
 Sauna (1992) (TV) as Jussi
 Straszny sen dzidziusia Górkiewicza (1993) a.k.a. The Terrible Dream of Babyface Gorkiewicz Trois couleurs: Blanc (1993) a.k.a. Three Colours: White as Karol Karol
 Zawrócony (1994) (TV) a.k.a. Reverted as Tomek Siwek
 Clandestin, Le (1994) (TV) as Yatsek
 Pulkownik Kwiatkowski (1995) a.k.a. Colonel Kwiatkowski as Dudek
 Pestka a.k.a. The Pip (1996)
 Slawa i chwala (1997) (TV) a.k.a. Fame and Glory as Franciszek Golabek
 Darmozjad polski (1997) a.k.a. Polish Freeloader, The as Swede
 Odwiedz mnie we snie (1997) a.k.a. Visit Me in My Dream Szczęśliwego Nowego Jorku (1997) a.k.a. Happy New York as Potejto
 Pulapka (1997) a.k.a. Trap, The Demony wojny wedlug Goi (1998) a.k.a. Demons of War as Cpl. 'Houdini' Moraczewski
 Kochaj i rób co chcesz (1998) a.k.a. Love, and Do Whatever You Want as Lech Ryszka
 23 (1998) as Sergej
 Ogniem i mieczem (1999) a.k.a. With Fire and Sword as Michal Wolodyjowski
 Pierwszy milion (2000) as Policeman a.k.a. First million Prymas - trzy lata z tysiaca (2000) a.k.a. The Primate as Priest Stanislaw Skorodecki
 Når nettene blir lange (2000) a.k.a. Cabin Fever as Brother-in-law
 Proof of Life (2000) as Terry's Driver
 Weiser (2001) as Kolota
 Lightmaker (2001) as Rumo Ranieri
 Sto minut wakacji (2001) (TV)  a.k.a. One houndred minutes of holydays Czesc Tereska (2001) a.k.a. Hi, Tereska as Edek
 Stacja (2001) a.k.a. Station as Dymecki, owner of petrol station
 Wiedzmin (2001) a.k.a. The Witcher/The Hexer as Jaskier Dandelion
 The Pianist (2002) as Customer with Coins
 Zmruz oczy (2002) a.k.a. Squint Your Eyes as Jasiek
 Distant Lights (2003) original title Lichter as Antoni. Director: Hans-Christian Schmid
 La Petite prairie aux bouleaux (2003) a.k.a. The Birch-Tree Meadow as Gutek
 Cialo (2003) a.k.a. Corpus as Dizel
  (2003) as Matuszek
 Zróbmy sobie wnuka (2003) a.k.a. Let's make ourselves a grandson  as Gustaw Mytnik
 Wrózby kumaka (2005) (post-production) a.k.a. The Call of the Toad Skazany na bluesa (2005) a.k.a. Destined for Blues as Mr. Henio
 Diabel (2005) a.k.a. Devil, The as Frank's friend
 Czas Surferów (2005) a.k.a. Surfer's time as Klama
 Hope (2007)
 Aftermath (2012)
 Walesa. Man of Hope (2013) as Nawislak
 Run Boy Run (2013) as Hersch Fridman
 Jack Strong (film) (2014)
 True Crimes (2016) as Lukasz
 Alzur's Legacy (2020) as Jaskier Dandelion
 Sweat (2020) as Fryderyk
 Sexify'' (2021) as dean Krzysztof Maślak

References

External links

 

1961 births
Living people
People from Brzeziny
Polish male film actors
Łódź Film School alumni
Polish male stage actors
Recipient of the Meritorious Activist of Culture badge